Hamoud Boualem is an Algerian soft drink manufacturing company, producing fizzy drinks popular in Algeria and exported to France, the United Kingdom, and Canada, mainly for consumption by Algerian emigrants. Founded in 1878 with the building of its first factory in the Belcourt neighborhood of Algiers, it is among the country's oldest companies. Their products include sodas such as "Selecto", "Hamoud", "Slim" (in various flavors), and various flavors of syrup.  Their head offices are located at 201 rue Hassiba Ben Bouali, Algiers.

History 
Youssef Hammoud, flavour distiller by profession, settled in the suburbs of Belcourt and creates the lemonade «La Royale», ancestor of the emblematic «Hamoud» la Blanche.
"La Royale", made from hand-selected lemon essence, wins a gold medal, classified Hors concours, at the Paris World Fair.
It later received several gold and silver medals.
1907
Victoria, a brownish apple and caramel flavor, is born. This drink, known today as SELECTO is part of the Algerian identity heritage.
1920
Boualem Hammoud, Youssef's grandson, registered the trademark and changed the name of the company from «Hamoud &Sons» to «Hamoud Boualem & Cie». It was then, that the company moved to Hassiba Ben Bouali Street, now the company’s headquarters.
Hamoud Boualem launches a lemon drink under the «Slim» label with the slogan «Slim, le citron qui prime». Today the Slim brand has five references (lemon, orange, green apple, pineapple and Bitter).The Hamoud and Hafiz families are joining forces.
The company changes status and becomes a LLC.
In 2003 Hamoud Boualem modernizes its installations and launches the PET format which completes its range of returnable glass.

The company is increasingly opening up to the export market.
The company inaugurates its new factory in Boufarik (wilaya of Blida) in order to increase its production capacity and thus, meet an ever increasing demand.
The Can, launched in 2017, brings a breath of freshness and dynamism to this over 100-year-old brand.
2018
Hamoud Boualem launches Lim ON, its new range of drinks with carbonated fruit juices, available in three flavors: Citrus, Orange pulp and Mojito .

In 2020, the PET is launched in 33cl and 1L capacity.

External links
 Official site
 La guerre des boissons gazeuses en Algérie

Food and drink companies of Algeria
Companies based in Algiers
Soft drinks manufacturers
Algerian brands
Multinational companies
African drinks
Algerian cuisine